The 2016 1. divisjon (referred to as OBOS-ligaen for sponsorship reasons) was a Norwegian second-tier football league season. The league was contested by 16 teams, and the top two teams were promoted to Tippeligaen, while the teams placed from third to sixth place played a promotion-playoff against the 14th-placed team in Tippeligaen to win promotion. The bottom four teams were be relegated to the 2. divisjon.

The first round of the season was played on 9 April 2016 and the season concluded with the last round on 30 October 2016. The playoff-tournament was played between 6 and 21 November 2016.

Team changes from 2015
In the 2015 1. divisjon, Sogndal, and Brann won promotion to Tippeligaen, while Follo, Nest-Sotra, Bærum and Hønefoss were relegated to the 2016 2. divisjon.

Mjøndalen, and Sandefjord, were relegated from the 2015 Tippeligaen, while KFUM Oslo, Raufoss, Ull/Kisa and Kongsvinger were promoted from the 2015 2. divisjon.

Teams

Managerial changes

League table

Results

Promotion play-offs

The third to sixth-placed teams took part in the promotion play-offs; these were single leg knockout matches, two semi-finals and a final. The winners, Jerv, advanced to play Stabæk over two legs in the Tippeligaen play-offs for a spot in the top-flight next season.

Semi-finals

Final

Season statistics

Top scorers

Most assists

References

Norwegian First Division seasons
2
Norway
Norway